Beinn Iaruinn (805 m) is a mountain in the Grampian Mountains, Scotland, northeast of the village of Spean Bridge.

It is one of a number of Corbetts that surround Glen Roy, and is famous for the natural 'Parallel Roads' feature on its slopes, an entirely natural feature.

References

Mountains and hills of Highland (council area)
Marilyns of Scotland
Corbetts